Richmond Avenue Methodist-Episcopal Church, also known as Richmond Avenue United Methodist Church, is a historic Methodist Episcopal Church located at Buffalo in Erie County, New York.  It consists of two structures: a rectilinear Chapel structure, which dates to 1885–1891, and a larger Temple structure dating to 1887–1898.  Both structures are two and a half stories set on a raised basement story, with two three-story towers.  They are built of ashlar Medina sandstone.  It is now home to the Upper West Side Arts Center.

It was listed on the National Register of Historic Places in 2008. It is located in the Elmwood Historic District–West.

References

Churches on the National Register of Historic Places in New York (state)
Churches completed in 1885
19th-century Methodist church buildings in the United States
Churches in Buffalo, New York
National Register of Historic Places in Buffalo, New York
Historic district contributing properties in Erie County, New York